Unhalfbricking is the third album by the British folk rock band Fairport Convention and their second album released in 1969. It is seen as a transitional album in their history and marked a further musical move away from American influences towards more traditional English folk songs that had begun on their previous album, What We Did on Our Holidays and reached its peak on the follow-up, Liege & Lief, released later the same year.

The album features several Bob Dylan songs, which he had not yet released. It also features what is arguably Sandy Denny's most notable achievement as a songwriter with the song "Who Knows Where the Time Goes?", which has been covered by many other performers and is now regarded as a classic. The only traditional song on the album, "A Sailor's Life", is seen as pivotal in the development of English folk rock music.

Changes in the line-up of the band, due not only to its musical direction but also to external events, mark this album as a turning point in the band's history. 1969 was a prolific year for Fairport Convention; from What We Did on Our Holidays to Liege & Lief within twelve months represented a major development.

The album also gave the band their first UK chart success, reaching number 12 in the UK album chart (the second highest position in the band's entire career), while the single release, "Si Tu Dois Partir", achieved number 21 in the UK singles chart.

Production
Fairport Convention had been invited to Bob Dylan's London music publishers to hear then-unreleased tracks from The Basement Tapes sessions. The band's bassist, Ashley Hutchings, said "We loved it all. We would have covered all the songs if we could." In the event, versions of "Percy's Song", "Million Dollar Bash" and "If You Gotta Go, Go Now" (retitled "Si Tu Dois Partir") were used on the album. The French lyrics for the latter were created during the interval of a performance at the Middle Earth Club. According to guitarist Simon Nicol: "I think the boredom factor was one of the reasons we came up with this wacky idea. Three or four punters joined us in the dressing room; they were either French visitors or students of French working in London, and happened to be there that night." "Percy's Song" and "Million Dollar Bash" had never been released before.

The band's male vocalist Iain Matthews left during the recordings for Unhalfbricking to make his own album Matthews' Southern Comfort, after recording just one track, "Percy's Song". Sandy Denny sang lead vocals on all the other songs, including her own compositions, "Autopsy", and "Who Knows Where the Time Goes?". The latter was covered by many artists and is now viewed to be a classic. The lengthy "A Sailor's Life", a traditional English folk song collected by A. L. Lloyd, was already part of Denny's club repertoire. In particular, the version on Unhalfbricking has been described as "the turning point of Fairport's history from earlier contemporary Americana to English songs" and by AllMusic's Richie Unterberger as a "clear signpost to the future".

Guitarist Richard Thompson contributed two compositions to the album. The opening track, "Genesis Hall", is a slow 3/4 waltz, on which Simon Nicol played dulcimer, while Sandy Denny provided the vocals; it was the B-Side of the single release. Genesis Hall was the nickname of the former Bell Hotel in Drury Lane, which had become a squat in early 1969 and later became noted for a mass eviction by the police. In the view of Mojo magazine reviewer Mike Baines, "Thompson's writing reached maturity on 'Genesis Hall'". "Cajun Woman", which opens the second side of the album, features Dave Swarbrick's fiddle-playing in his first work with Fairport; having no electric pick-ups, the band improvised by smashing open a telephone and attaching the microphone to the instrument with an elastic band.

Title and cover
The title arose from the band playing the word game Ghost while travelling to and from gigs. Its object was to "avoid completing a real word", and "Unhalfbricking" was Sandy Denny's creation.

Eric Hayes took the photo on the sleeve design for the UK release, which featured neither album title nor band name. The photo captured Denny's parents, Neil and Edna Denny, standing outside the family home at 9B Arthur Road, Wimbledon, south London, with the band distantly visible through the garden fence. St Mary's Church, Wimbledon, can be seen in the background. Joe Boyd later said "Unhalfbricking, then, that cover shot was taken in the early spring, right before the crash, I think; and that record came out in June".

Unhalfbricking'''s cover in the US, released by A&M Records, was even less informative. It consisted of a picture of circus elephants with a small inset image of the band, allegedly because "the group apparently so upset their American label that they replaced it with an image of trampolining elephants".

Aftermath
On 11 May 1969, two months before the album was released, drummer Martin Lamble and Jeannie Franklyn, the girlfriend of guitarist Richard Thompson, were killed in a road accident as the band was returning from a concert in Birmingham. Simon Nicol later said:  Ashley Hutchings also said in relation to the album cover photograph: Unhalfbricking appeared, therefore, at a difficult time for the group, but was enthusiastically received. After a period of intense reflection about their future they decided to pursue the folk rock idea further and violinist Dave Swarbrick and drummer Dave Mattacks were invited to join full-time for the follow-up, Liege & Lief.

Reception

AllMusic's Richie Unterberger described Unhalfbricking as "a transitional album for the young Fairport Convention, in which the group shed its closest ties to its American folk-rock influences and started to edge toward a more traditional British folk-slanted sound".Rolling Stone's John Mendelsohn, reviewing Unhalfbricking alongside Liege and Lief, was supportive, describing it as "Fairport Convention at its best" and singling out "Percy's Song" in particular as "the album's gem". He was less complimentary about "A Sailor's Life", regarding it as overlong.

The album also gave the band their first UK chart success, spending a total of eight weeks in the UK album chart and reaching number 12. The single "Si Tu Dois Partir" spent nine weeks on the UK singles chart and reached number 21. Fairport Convention appeared on Top of the Pops on 14 August 1969, miming to the song and augmented by a roadie, Steve Sparks on percussion.

It was voted number 688 in the third edition of Colin Larkin's All Time Top 1000 Albums (2000). In 2004 Q magazine placed Unhalfbricking at number 41 in its list of the 50 Greatest British Albums Ever, and in the same year The Observer, describing it as "a thoroughly English masterpiece", listed it at number 27 in its Top 100 British Albums. The following year, 2005, it was included in Robert Dimery's  "1001 Albums You Must Hear Before You Die". The Sandy Denny track "Who Knows Where the Time Goes?" was voted "Favourite Folk Track of All Time" by listeners in the Radio 2 Folk Awards 2007. In 2010 Unhalfbricking was voted the second best Fairport Convention album after Liege & Lief by Mojo magazine readers.

Track listing

Release historyUnhalfbricking'' has been released on several occasions and in several formats:

Personnel
Fairport Convention
 Sandy Denny – vocals, harpsichord
 Richard Thompson – electric and acoustic guitars, electric dulcimer, piano accordion, organ, backing vocals
 Ashley Hutchings – bass, backing vocals
 Simon Nicol – electric and acoustic guitars, electric dulcimer, backing vocals
 Martin Lamble – drums, stacked chair backs on "Si Tu Dois Partir"

Additional personnel
 Iain Matthews – backing vocals on "Percy's Song"
 Dave Swarbrick – fiddle on "Si Tu Dois Partir", "A Sailor's Life", and "Cajun Woman" and Mandolin on "Million Dollar Bash"
 Trevor Lucas – triangle on "Si Tu Dois Partir"
 Marc Ellington – vocals on "Million Dollar Bash"
 Dave Mattacks – drums on "Ballad of Easy Rider"

Production
 Recorded at Sound Techniques and Olympic Studios, London
 Engineer: John Wood
 Sleeve design: Diogenic Attempts Ltd.
Source:

References

Fairport Convention albums
1969 albums
Island Records albums
Albums produced by Joe Boyd
A&M Records albums
Albums recorded at Olympic Sound Studios